William Dobson, (30 March 1650 - 15 June 1731) was an English  academic.

Dobson was born in Hampshire and educated at Trinity College, Oxford. He was  President of Trinity from 1706 until his death. He also held the livings at Cliddesden, Farleigh and Garsington.

References

Clergy from Hampshire
1650 births
1731 deaths
Alumni of Trinity College, Oxford
Presidents of Trinity College, Oxford